Paargad Fort is situated to the south of Kolhapur in Maharashtra state in India, at a distance of around 28;km from Chandgad. One of the major attractions of this fort is its serene environment and lush green surroundings. Apart from this, it is also known for housing a wonderful bronze statue of Chatrapati Shivaji and a temple of Bhagawati Bhawani.

The gad can be trekked from the village of Morle and across Palye located in Dodamarg taluka. Bus service runs from Dodamarg to Morle (18 km) and Dodamarg to Palye (16km). A bus service also runs from Chandagad directly to Pargad

On the way to Pargad from Goa also visit towns of Dodamarg, Palye and Medhe for the beautifully crafted tanks. We also visit Tilari Dam.

Fort was maintained by Raiba (Son of Tanaji Malusare).

Forts in Maharashtra
Tourist attractions in Kolhapur district

Satellite view of Pargad Fort

Paargad